is a city located in Gifu Prefecture, Japan. , the city had an estimated population of 88,473 in 35,644 households, and a population density of 41 persons per km2. The total area of the city was  making it the largest city by area in Japan. The high altitude and separation from other areas of Japan kept the area fairly isolated, allowing Takayama to develop its own culture over about a 300-year period.

Etymology
The name 'Takayama' means 'tall mountain'.

Geography
Takayama is located in northern Gifu Prefecture, in the heart of the Japanese Alps. The city has the largest geographic area of any municipality in Japan.

Neighbouring municipalities
Gifu Prefecture
Hida
Gujō
Gero
Shirakawa
Nagano Prefecture
Ōmachi
Matsumoto
Kiso
Toyama Prefecture
Toyama
Ishikawa Prefecture
Hakusan
Fukui Prefecture
Ōno

Climate
The city has a climate characterized by hot and humid summers, and mild winters (Köppen climate classification Dfa). It features four distinct seasons with a wide range of temperatures between the summer and winter, somewhat resembling parts of northern Japan and Hokkaido. Takayama and many other places exposed to the Sea of Japan experience lake-effect snow, generating some of the highest, most consistent snowfall in the world.

Spring is short-lived, usually dry with mild temperatures and plenty of sunshine. Cherry blossoms can be seen in Takayama from the middle to the end of April, around three weeks later than Nagoya.

Summer begins around the end of May to the beginning of June.

Autumn approaches during the middle of October and is short and dry. and cool with diminishing sunlight. Colorful  can be seen in the Takayama area from the end of October to the first week of November.

Winter arrives around the beginning of December and is moderately long, cold, and icy with high amounts of snowfall annually amounting to an average of  commonly leading to the development of snowbanks in the outer areas of the city. The first snowfall usually arrives at the end of November and lasts until the beginning of April.

Demographics
Per Japanese census data, the population of Takayama peaked around the year 2000 and has declined since.

History
The area around Takayama was part of traditional Hida Province and was settled as far back as the Jōmon period. During the Sengoku period, Kanamori Nagachika ruled the area from Takayama Castle and the town of Takayama developed as a castle town. During the Edo period, the area was tenryō under the direct control of the Tokugawa shogunate. In the post-Meiji Restoration cadastral reforms, Ōno District in Gifu prefecture was created, and the town of Takayama was established in 1889 with the creation of the modern municipalities system. At the time, it was the most populous municipality in Gifu Prefecture. On November 1, 1936, Takayama merged with the town of Onada, forming the city of Takayama. Takayama annexed the village of Josue in 1943 and the village of Ohachiga in 1955. On February 1, 2005, the town of Kuguno and the villages of Asahi, Kiyomi, Miya, Nyūkawa, Shōkawa, and Takane (all from Ōno District), the town of Kokufu, and the village of Kamitakara (both from Yoshiki District) were created to merge and expanded city of Takayama. This made Takayama both the largest city and largest municipality in Japan by area.

Government
Takayama has a mayor-council form of government with a directly elected mayor and a unicameral city legislature of 24 members.

Economy
The economy of Takayama is strongly based on tourism, agriculture, and woodworking.

Education

Colleges and universities
Gifu University – Takayama Watershed Area Science Research Centre
Kyoto University – Hida Observatory
Nagoya University – Takayama Earthquake Observatory

Primary and secondary education
Takayama has 19 public elementary schools and 12 public middle schools operated by the city government. The city has three public high schools operated by the Gifu Prefectural Board of Education, and one private high school.

Transportation

Railway
 JR Tōkai – Takayama Main Line
 –  –  –  –  –  –

Highway
 Tōkai-Hokuriku Expressway
 Chūbu-Jūkan Expressway

Sister city relations

In Japan
Matsumoto, Nagano Prefecture (est. November 1, 1971)
Hiratsuka, Kanagawa Prefecture (est. October 22, 1982)
Echizen, Fukui Prefecture (est. October 22, 1982)
Kaminoyama, Yamagata Prefecture (est. October 13, 1988)

Overseas
 Denver, Colorado, United States (est. June 27, 1960)
 Lijiang, Yunnan, People's Republic of China friendship city (est. March 21, 2002)
 Kunming, Yunnan, People's Republic of China friendship city (est. April 23, 2012)
 Sibiu, Romania, friendship city (est. September 4, 2012)
 Urubamba, Cusco, Peru friendship city (est. August 22, 2013)

Local attractions
This city was selected as one of the top ten travel destinations in Asia by Lonely Planet Magazine in the year 2017.
A bus takes visitors to a point near the summit.
Shin-Hotaka Ropeway and Okuhida Spa Resort: There is a 3,200-meter ropeway offering great views of the Northern Alps.
There are old homes in the heart of Takayama that are cultural artifacts.
Takayama has multiple morning markets near the river in the center of town.
The Hida Minzoku Mura Folk Village is nearby.
Takayama is the home of one of the three largest Shinto festivals in Japan. The Takayama Festivals are two distinctive festivals. The yatai (floats) used can be found in the Takayama Yatai Kaikan (Takayama Festival Float Exhibition Hall). Nearby is the Sakurayama Nikkō Kan, an exhibit of 1/10 scale replicas of Nikkō's famous Tōshō-gū shrine.
Takayama-shi Kyodo-kan is a local history museum with handicrafts and traditional items.
Takayama Jin'ya is a historical government house and National Historic Site
Kusakabe Folk Museum is a local museum in an old merchant's home.
Hida Kokubun-ji, founded in the Nara period as the provincial temple of Hida, it is the oldest structure in Takayama. It has a three-level pagoda and stands beside a ginkgo tree that is over 1,200 years old.
Ankokuji Temple and Storehouse is an ancient structure from 1408 that is recognized as a national treasure.
Hida Takayama Kur Alp (Hida Takayama Spa Land) is a large public bath and swimming area.
World shrine to Su-God, the worldwide headquarters of Sukyo Mahikari organization 
Hida Tōshō-gū shrine
Akahogi Tile Kiln Site, a National Historic Site
Dōnosora Site, ruins of a Jōmon period village, a National Historic Site

Culture

Takayama is known for its local foods, including sansai (mountain vegetables), wasakana (river fish), beef, soba, ramen, and sake.
In addition to its fame for its carpentry, Takayama is well known for its lacquerware, pottery, and furniture.
The mountain city of Takayama is associated with charms known as "sarubobos", which are traditionally passed from grandmothers to grandchildren and mothers to daughters, though are now often sold as souvenirs. The city and the Hida area are also known for carpentry, and its carpenters are called Hida no takumi.
These festivals are among the most popular in Japan.
Takayama was the basis for the settings in the anime series Hyōka, adapted from Honobu Yonezawa's Classic Literature Club series. Designs of the fictional city of Kamiyama are based on Takayama.

See also
Takayama Festival

References

External links

Takayama City official website 
Hida official website (Japanese, English, Italian, Russian, Thai, Portuguese, Chinese, Korean, Spanish, French and German)
Gifu crossroads (official blog about tourism in Gifu) (English)
hirayuonsen

 
Cities in Gifu Prefecture